Akhtaj (also Romanized as Ākhtāj; also known as Ākhtāch) is a village in Alishar Rural District, Kharqan District, Zarandieh County, Markazi Province, Iran. At the 2006 census, its population was 19, in 5 families.

References 

Populated places in Zarandieh County